The University of Southern Queensland (branded as UniSQ and formerly branded as USQ) is a medium-sized, regional university based in Toowoomba, Queensland, Australia, with three university campuses at Toowoomba, Springfield and Ipswich. It offers courses in law, health, engineering, the sciences, business, education, and the arts. The institution was established in 1969 as the Darling Downs campus of the Queensland Institute of Technology. In 1970, the institution had provided studying programs for rural Queensland and international communities. In 1971, it became the Darling Downs Institute of Advanced Education, then the University College of Southern Queensland in 1990 and finally the University of Southern Queensland in 1992. It operates three research institutes and seven research centres which focus on a wide range of business, agricultural, scientific, environmental, and technological issues.

The university is recognised for having the largest Japanese-designed garden in Australia, Australia's largest solar integrated carpark, and a library with rainforest and water features. In 2017, the university won the international Green Gown award for its approach to sustainability focusing on renewable energy, waste reduction, water retention, and integration of sustainability into strategic planning.

In 2012, the university's archaeologists discovered the oldest Australian rock art of 28,000 years old in the Northern Territory, and in 2018, the university's astronomers discovered a new planet that orbits an ancient star almost 2 billion years older than the sun.

The university has been recognised for its efforts in preventing violence against women and was cited as employer of choice for gender equality by the Federal Government's Workplace Gender Equality Agency (WGEA).

In June 2022, the university announced it was changing its branding from USQ to UniSQ, accompanied by a change in logo.

History

Dellys Kelly 
At the age of 26, Dellys Kelly was working as a manager at East Greenmount. In 1958, with a bought map, she drove to Canberra to start her campaign for a new university in Toowoomba. After driving to the Parliament House and asking to meet with Prime Minister Robert Menzies, she was challenged by him to raise £30,000 before he would discuss the issue. She received strong support from the community, and after eleven weeks, the money was raised. In 1960, the Darling Downs University Establishment Association was founded.

Overview 
Queensland Institute of Technology (Darling Downs) opened on 2 February 1967 in Toowoomba, beginning with 140 foundation students. In 1971, the institute became the Darling Downs Institute of Advanced Education (DDIAE). Managed by its own College Council, DDIAE educated 75% of the country's international students in the 1986–1987 school year. From 1980 to 1990, DDIAE grew significantly from 1,000 to 8,000 full-time student equivalents (EFTSL). It became the University College of Southern Queensland (UCSQ) in 1990, under the sponsorship of the University of Queensland. In 1992, the institution became the University of Southern Queensland (USQ) when it gained full university status. USQ was a founding member of the Regional Universities Network that was launched in 2011. The Network's research in 2013 showed that USQ generated $411.7 million into the economy of Queensland every year as well as household income of $255.4 million and 3,313 jobs in the communities of Toowoomba, Fraser Coast, and Springfield.  Along with Toowoomba's investments in data centers, landscaped and business parks, air and land infrastructures, UniSQ has been contributing to making the region a centre of agribusiness, sustainable development, and trade.

Milestones 
 2004, 8 July: Groundbreaking was held at Springfield campus.
 2006, 11 August: Springfield campus was officially opened by Minister for Education and Science Julie Bishop.
 2007, Semester 1: The first students started their studies at Springfield campus.
 2014, 5 March: Health & Recreation Club worth of $1.2 million and Engineering Laboratory were opened at Springfield campus.
 2015, 7 January: Ipswich campus was formally transferred to USQ.
 2015, 10 August: Clinical simulation labs worth of $1.7 million were opened at Ipswich campus.
 2015, 26 August: Building B (Awarded 6 Star Green Star by Green Building Council of Australia) worth of $45 million was opened at Springfield campus.
 2016, Semester 1: Bachelor of Aviation was launched at Springfield campus and Bachelor of Midwifery was launched at Ipswich campus.
 2016, 20 June: Psychology and Counselling Clinic was opened at Ipswich campus.
 2017, 1 March: Midwifery Simulation Centre and Paramedic Simulation House were opened at Ipswich campus.
 2017, 27 October: Boeing 737 flight simulator worth of $1 million went into operation at Springfield campus.
 2017, Semester 2: The first students of Bachelor of Paramedicine were farewelled at Ipswich campus.

Campuses

UniSQ ensures that, as a regional university, its curriculum serves local and regional employment needs, as well as engaging in regional social and economic development and serving the regional community.

In stage two of the Sustainable Energy Solution project commenced in September 2017, 1198 solar panels were installed on building rooftops across USQ campuses in Springfield and Ipswich, generating 586,949 kilowatt hours and reducing thousands of tonnes of carbon emissions each year. As of 31 May 2018, smoking is banned in all areas at UniSQ.

Toowoomba campus
UniSQ Toowoomba is close to Toowoomba Wellcamp Airport and is approximately a two-hour drive from Brisbane. The campus has lecture theatres and syndicate rooms in the School of Business Building. The campus offers degrees in sciences, creative arts and media, business and commerce, engineering and built environment, education, health and community, information technology, humanities and communication, law and justice, English language programs, and pathway programs. There is a theatre, science laboratories, Olympic standard basketball courts, a 24 hour-access gym with high-tech equipment, a tennis centre, an aerobics center, and netball courts at the Clive Berghofer Rec Center, social clubs, and other accommodation. It has the country's largest Japanese-designed garden (the Ju Raku En) and the Gumbi Gumbi gardens. Three co-educational residential colleges located on this campus are McGregor, Steele Rudd, and Concannon.

Springfield campus
Springfield's public transportation includes bus services and a return train to Brisbane CBD. Serving as a hub for digital production and performance, the campus offers a range of undergraduate and postgraduate programs and includes a radio station, science and engineering laboratories, a television studio with spaces for rehearsal, collaborative teaching rooms, a fitness and recreation centre, an auditorium, and on-campus accommodation. The campus's flight simulator is helpful for aviation students to replicate both normal and abnormal scenarios of a flight with checks and procedures applied to airline pilots. Phoenix Radio at UniSQ Springfield is an online community radio station that serves the Greater Ipswich region and also provides training for students enrolled in the Bachelor of Applied Media program.

Ipswich campus

UniSQ Ipswich is located in the growing region of southeast Queensland, 40 minutes from the Brisbane CBD. The campus is home to UniSQ's health programs, which has laboratories for clinical nursing students, custom-built training facilities for paramedicine students, café, gym, and different sports fields. UniSQ Ipswich offers degrees in nursing, paramedicine, psychology, and counselling as well as tertiary preparation programs. The campus also includes a library with a rainforest and water features designed to increase air quality and contribute to the learning environment.

Academic departments, organisations, and activities

Business, Education Law and Arts (BELA)
School of Creative Arts
School of Commerce
School of Law and Justice
School of Management and Enterprise
School of Education
School of Humanities and Communication

Health, Engineering and Sciences (HES)
School of Sciences
School of Civil Engineering and Surveying
School of Health and Wellbeing
School of Nursing and Midwifery
School of Mechanical and Electrical Engineering
School of Psychology and Counselling

Extracurricular activities
UniSQ students, staff, and faculty members engage in a variety of extracurricular activities, such as taking part in the One Million Stars to End Violence project, organising symposiums to change people's attitude about children with autism, improving literacy for Indigenous children, and providing healthcare to disadvantaged communities in Thailand. In 2017, the Association for Tertiary Education Management (ATEM) presented USQ Stars Campaign to End Violence with the Engagement Australia Award for Excellence in Community Engagement. In 2015, the Enactus National Conference and Competition recognised three projects (Cash to Grow, Tertiary Texts, and Project Ignite) by eight UniSQ students (majoring in business, accounting, law, human services, psychology, and education) for creating positive impacts in local communities. The members of UniSQ's Golden Key Chapter (an invitation-only honour society, including of top 15% students from universities worldwide based on their academic achievement) also engage in a wide range of activities to serve the community, including volunteering with local schools, youth clubs, and state emergency service.

Law Society
The Law Society at UniSQ organises a yearly MOOT competition for law students and a Secondary Schools MOOT competition for young high schoolers. The winners of UniSQ's MOOT competition represent the region to take part in the Association National Championship Moot organised in Brisbane for Australian law students. The winners of USQ's Secondary Schools MOOT competition received scholarships to study in law programs at USQ. USQ's Law Society also organises events for law students to get career advice from professionals and learn to overcome challenges in the profession.

Sport 
In the 2015 Northern Uni Games, UniSQ student-athletes won a gold medal in women's tennis, both gold and silver medals in lawn bowls, and bronze medals in both men's and women's basketball. In 2016 Northern Uni Games, UniSQ student-athletes won two gold medals in women's hockey and women's tennis, and a silver medal in open lawn bowls. In 2017 Northern Uni Games, UniSQ student-athletes won three gold medals in men's tennis, woman's tennis, and golf handicap, one silver medal in men's basketball, and another bronze medal in men's tennis. UniSQ students also competed in other sport tournaments at national and international levels, such as represented the Queensland Blades in the 2017 Australian Hockey League Championships, won the first places in ANB Qld State Championships, received the national Green and Gold merit after the annual 2016 Australian University Games, and captained Australia in the 2018 Indoor Hockey World Cup in Germany.

Change Makers
UniSQ also supports year 11 and 12 students with skills to improve the quality of life in local communities through Change Makers program. The program provides young students with financial support, guidance, and other resources to develop their visions of a better future and bring these ideas into practice. The program is an opportunity for students, especially disadvantaged students, to engage in teamwork, develop the skills of public speaking and project management. According to the National Center for Student Equity in Higher Education, twenty projects have been completed by students through Change Makers programs, including building a garden in community school to feed homeless people, raising awareness of inequality through concerts, and managing other projects dealing with pollution in community environments. The program won the CASE Circle of Excellence Silver Award for Public Relations and Community Relations Projects in 2015.

Arts and poetry 
UniSQ's students produce plays, films, and entertainment shows addressing culture, gender identity, and the struggles of young people, including Ghosts of Leigh by Dallas Baker, Velvet Bourlevard by Ian Fulton, and I dated Batman by Tammy Sarah. The university also established the Bruce Dawe Poetry Prize (named after the university's first honorary professor for his contribution to the university) in 1999 to honour the most prominent poets in Australia. In addition, USQ Artsworx, established as an art venue and production house, supports students, artists, and community art activities through its McGregor Summer School, McGregor bursary, exhibition sponsorships at Downland Art exhibition, Hampton Art exhibition, GraduArt exhibition (annual art exhibition by USQ's students), and art exhibition raising funds for breast cancer treatment at St. Vincent Hospital.

Justice and gender equality
The flexible work arrangements and the program of Women's Advancement reflect the university's commitment to gender equality and the role of women in the workplace. Funded by the Department of Foreign Affairs and Trade (DFAT), the Australian Centre for Sustainable Business and Development at UniSQ has conducted different international programs of approximately $1 million, such as Australian Awards Fellowship and AusAid Australian Leadership Awards Fellowship, aiming at fostering the role of women in business in accordance with Australian policies and practices.

Academic profile

Educational programs
It provides on-campus education that serves Darling Downs, Wide Bay, and Southern and Western Queensland as well as flexible learning programs through external learning or via off campus and overseas education partners in southern Africa, Fiji, South-east Asia, Sweden, Norway, and The Emirates. It operates the European Study Center in Bretten, Germany. UniSQ maintains accreditations for professional programs with professional and competent authorities, such as Australian Psychology Accreditation Council (APAC), Australian Nursing and Midwifery Accreditation Council (ANMAC),  Legal Practitioners Admissions Board and Chief Justice of Queensland,  Chartered Institute of Management Accountants (CIMA), Association of International Accountants (AIA),  CPA Australia, Chartered Accountants Australia and New Zealand (CAANZ), Australian Computer Society, and Australian Human Resources Institute (AHRI). UniSQ won the Australian University of the Year Award in 2000–2001. UniSQ has 14 fields of research rated at and above world average standards by Excellence in Research for Australia (ERA) in 2015. In the last audit, the ERA acknowledged UniSQ's pharmaceutical sciences, materials engineering, pharmacology, environmental science and management as well above world average standards. Attested with Quality System Certification of Registration, UniSQ maintains high educational standards through a program of centralised, staff-driven decision-making, discipline-based management, and quality assurance practices.A 2002 audit found that its quality assurance program could be more effective with improved systems of central monitoring and reviewing.

Beside providing a digital learning platform (partly funded with $50 million by the federal government) for all courses and disciplines, the university also provides students with face-to-face instructions and real-life experiences, including the opportunity for students in the Bachelor of Applied Media (BMA) program to do all parts of production and direction of Connected, a lifestyle show produced for 31 Digital.  Students at USQ took part in and won top awards at Miami and Tropfest international film competitions. The agreement between the West Wellcamp Airport and the Airline Academy of Australia includes that UniSQ provides undergraduate and post-graduate training for aviators in coordination with the academy's programs. Students in aviation program will receive professional pilot qualification issued by Australian Civil Aviation Authority after graduation and have the opportunities to take trial flights before commencing the program. They also have access to work-based training and further career development with Qantas Future Pilots Program. The university organised field trips for nursing students to provide healthcare in rural communities in Vietnam (funded through federal government's New Colombo program) and for researchers to raise awareness of root-lesion in India.

The Good Universities Guide 2018 showed that UniSQ Engineering and Psychology received high scores in graduates' full-time employment, and UniSQ received best overall ratings in the measures of gradates's full-time employment (82.5% / national average of 69.5%), starting salary, and equity. Professors and researchers at UniSQ gained important positions with regional and international organisations, such as Fulbright and Queensland's Institute of Electrical and Electronics Engineers (IEEE). USQ's students benefit from partnerships and exchange programs between the university and other universities and organisations, such as Australian National University, University of California Riverside, and NASA. The university offers students a number of scholarships  each year, such as School Partners Programs Scholarship and Vice-Chancellor's Principal's Recommendation Scholarship. Visitor speakers and lecturers at USQ come from different professional backgrounds, including NASA astronaut Colonel Robert S. Kimbrough,  Chief Justice of the High Court Susan Kiefel, News Director Mike Dalton from Nine News Regional Queensland, rugby player Steve Walter, and bestselling author Steve Maraboli.

Research 
UniSQ's research institutes are: 
Digital Life Lab (DLL)
Institute for Life Sciences and the Environment 
Institute for Advanced Engineering and Space Sciences
Institute for Resilient Regions (IRR)

UniSQ's research centres are: 
Australian Centre for Sustainable Business and Development (ACSBD)
Centre for Crop Health (CHH)
Centre of Excellence in Engineering Fibre Composites (CEEFC)
Centre for Health Sciences Research (CHSR)
Computational Engineering and Science Research Centre (CERSC)
International Centre for Applied Climate Science (ICACS)
Centre for Future Materials (CFM)
Centre for Agricultural Engineering (CAE) (formerly NCEA)

The University of Southern Queensland has three research institutes and seven research centres which focus on issues such as agricultural technology, rural health, environmental management, biotechnology, education leadership, web based services, and fibre composite materials. Based on competitive grants won and industry-funded research collaborations, UniSQ has significant and core research strength in the broad area of agriculture and the environment. This core research strength generated over $10 million in new grant and industry funding, announced by vice-chancellor Bill Lovegrove in 2008. In 2003, the university established the Institute for Agriculture and the Environment (IAgE) with improved biotechnology and pathology laboratories.  In 2017, the Queensland Drought Mitigation Centre (QDMC) was established as a result of collaboration between the university and the government. In 2017, as a part of the mega $15m campus expansion, the university started upgrading the Agricultural Science and Engineering Precinct (ASEP) to facilitate agricultural and material engineering development, including constructing new microbiology laboratories, glasshouses, dehumidified storage, and controlled ecological environments, developing methods of soil pathogen resistance, and applying vision sensing and robotics trials.  In 2017, the university hosted Australia's first regional meeting with Australia-ASEAN Council (AAC) in Toowoomba Campus to discuss the issue of trade and agriculture in preparation for the Sydney ASEAN-Australia Special Summit in 2018. The participants addressed the global demand for food, the current problems in the industry, and the development of new technologies in environmental science, engineering, and agribusiness. In 2018, a new climate project of $8 million was established by the university, the Queensland government, and the MLA, bringing together world scientists to find better solutions for managing drought and predicting seasonal climates. UniSQ researchers undertake different roles with international climate organisations, such as the president of the United Nations’ World Meteorological Organization (with the commission to design better services for global agribusiness and climate risk management) and ocean expeditor in the Overturning in the Subpolar North Atlantic Program (with the mission to examine how ocean currents affect the world's weather). UniSQ also supports the usage of renewable energy by integrating 2MW solar power system with the carpark in Toowoomba campus to provide energy to the campus's activities, reducing the emission of carbon dioxide by 20 percent.

In addition, UniSQ has developed projects in the fields of construction industry and space research. The university's Centre for Future Materials (CFM) has researched and applied the technique of fibre reinforced polymer (FRP) in the project of Toowoomba City Hall renovation. The university, in collaboration with the Commonwealth Scientific and Industrial Research Organisation (CSIRO) and international researchers, has developed a project in researching green cement without reliance on clay and limestone. In 2017, the university, in collaboration with University of Sydney and University of New South Wales, received funding to build a telescope facility at Mount Kent Observatory, Darling Downs, Queensland. The new telescope facility has been supporting Australian astronomers to discover planet systems and perform an important role in NASA's TESS (Transiting Exoplanet Survey Satellite) mission.

Student enrolments
The university's student body includes full-time and part-time students from both Australia and overseas countries. Based upon the results of the 2013 International student barometer survey, USQ was named the top university for international student satisfaction in Australia that year. UniSQ's students come from a diversity of cultural backgrounds and speak different languages. In 2015, the university had around 28,203 students of which approximately 84% were domestic students, 16% were international students, 15.8 was the number of students per staff, and 1.17 was the student ratio of females to males.

Notable alumni

 Angie Asimus - TV presenter on Seven News Sydney.
Alix Bidstrup - actress, starred on All Saints as Amy Fielding. 
Kev Carmody - Singer and songwriter, ARIA Hall of Fame
Teresa Hsu Chih - Singaporean social worker
Melanie Zanetti – Australian actress, best known for voicing Chilli Heeler on Bluey
Richard Dalla-Riva - Australian politician, Minister for Manufacturing, Exports and Trade from 2010 to 2013
Russell Dykstra- Australian actor
'Aisake Eke - Former Minister of Finance and National Planning, Kingdom of Tonga
Deb Frecklington - Australian politician, first female leader of LNP
Jason Gann - Actor and writer
Stephen Hagan - Australian former diplomat, author, activist, newspaper editor, documentary maker, and university lecturer
Shameel Joosub - South African businessman and CEO of Vodacom, a South African telecommunications operator within Africa
Atul Khare - Indian Foreign Service officer, United Nations Under-Secretary-General for Field Support
Preetha Krishna - Indian spiritual teacher
Nelle Lee - Australian actress, producer and writer
Jamus Lim - Singaporean Member of Parliament and economist
Katrina Fong Lim - Lord Mayor of Darwin (3 April 2012 – 4 September 2017)
Paul Lucas - Former politician and Attorney-General of Queensland
John McVeigh - former Minister for Regional Development, Territories and Local Government
Stuart Mayer Commander Australian Fleet, Royal Australian Navy, from 2014 to 2018
Theresa Moltoni - Businessperson, President of Chamber of Commerce & Industry Queensland, recipient of OAM in the 2016 Queens Birthday Honours
Claire Moore - Australian politician, Queensland senator
Tina Morgan Australian taekwondo coach and former international competitor
Ingrid Moses - Australian academic, Chancellor of the University of Canberra from 2006 to 2011
Joe Roff - Rugby union footballer, CEO of John James Foundation
Senator the Hon Anne Ruston - Australian politician, South Australia senator
Sebastian Teo - Singaporean politician and President of NSP
Christian Thompson - Artist
Adam Zwar - Actor and writer

Partner Institution

Malaysia
Universiti Tunku Abdul Rahman

See also

List of universities in Australia

Notes

References

External links
University of Southern Queensland
University of Southern Queensland - Sydney Education Centre
USQ Student guild

 
University of Southern Queensland
Educational institutions established in 1992
University of Southern Queensland
Universities in Queensland
1992 establishments in Australia
Schools in Queensland